Caught is a 1931 American Pre-Code Western film directed by Edward Sloman and written by Agnes Brand Leahy and Keene Thompson. The film stars Richard Arlen, Louise Dresser, Frances Dee, Tom Kennedy, and Syd Saylor. The film was released on August 8, 1931, by Paramount Pictures.

Cast
Richard Arlen as Lt. Tom Colton
Louise Dresser as Calamity Jane
Frances Dee as Kate Winslow
Tom Kennedy as Jard Harmon
Martin Burton as Curly Braydon
Marcia Manners as Goldie
Syd Saylor as Sgt. Weems
James Mason as Scully 
Guy Oliver as McNeill
Edward LeSaint as Haverstraw
Charles K. French as Bradford
Lon Poff as Clem

References

External links 
 

1931 films
American Western (genre) films
1931 Western (genre) films
Paramount Pictures films
Films directed by Edward Sloman
American black-and-white films
1930s English-language films
1930s American films